Matwai Baranov (also known as "Matvai"; מאטוויי ברנוב; born September 2, 1965) is an Israeli former Olympic wrestler.

Wrestling career
Baranov came 9th in the 1991 World Wrestling Championships at 68.0 kg. in Greco-Roman wrestling.

He competed for Israel at the 1992 Summer Olympics in Barcelona, Spain, in wrestling at the age of 26. He wrestled in the Men's Lightweight, Greco-Roman, and lost to Stoyan Stoyanov of Bulgaria in Round Two, and to bronze medal winner Rodney Smith of the United States in Round Three.

References

External links
 

Olympic wrestlers of Israel
1965 births
Israeli male sport wrestlers
Wrestlers at the 1992 Summer Olympics
Living people
20th-century Israeli people